Donji Dubič is a village in the municipality of Trstenik, Serbia. According to the 2011 census, the village has a population of  182 people.

References

Populated places in Rasina District